Cookie is the nickname of:

 Queen Elizabeth The Queen Mother (1900–2002), given by the Duchess of Windsor
 Cookie Belcher (born 1978), American basketball player
 Carlos Carrasco (baseball) (born 1987), Venezuelan-born Major League Baseball pitcher
 Charles Cook (dancer) (1914–1991), American tap dancer 
 Cookie Cunningham (1905–1995), American football player, basketball player and basketball coach
 Cookie Cuccurullo (1918–1983), Major League Baseball pitcher
 Cookie Gilchrist (1935–2011), American Football League and Canadian Football League player
 Howard Krongard (born 1940), head of the Office of the Inspector General of the Department of State under President George W. Bush
 Cookie Lavagetto (1912–1990), Major League Baseball player, manager and coach
 Les Long (1915–1944), British Second World War pilot and prisoner of war executed for participating in the "Great Escape"
 Cookie Mueller (1949–1989), American actress and writer
 Cookie Rojas (born 1939), Cuban-born former Major League Baseball player
 Cookie Tackwell (born 1906), National Football League player
 Huey Thierry (1936–1997), American musician and leader of Cookie and his Cupcakes

Lists of people by nickname